Nephelomys childi is a species of rodent in the genus Nephelomys of family Cricetidae. It was named after Mr. George D. Child, who assisted in obtaining the type series.

The holotype is a medium-sized animal with a long tail. The upperparts are generally grey–brown in color, with a darker patch at the middle of the back. There is a clear separation in color between the upperparts and the underparts, which have light grey hairs with white tips. The upper surface of the long feet is whitish. The large ears are black and covered with fine hairs. The tail is brown above and near-white below.

Both N. childi and its synonym oconnelli were originally described as species of Oryzomys, Oryzomys childi and Oryzomys o'connelli. They were compared, respectively, to O. meridensis (currently Nephelomys meridensis) and O. pectoralis (currently Nephelomys pectoralis). Later they were submerged in a broadly defined Oryzomys albigularis (currently Nephelomys albigularis), but when the genus Nephelomys was extracted from Oryzomys in 2006, N. childi was reinstated as a separate species.

References

Literature cited
Allen, J.A. 1913. New South American Muridae. Bulletin of the American Museum of Natural History 32:597–604.
Musser, G.G. and Carleton, M.D. 2005. Superfamily Muroidea. Pp. 894–1531 in Wilson, D.E. and Reeder, D.M. (eds.). Mammal Species of the World: a taxonomic and geographic reference. 3rd ed. Baltimore: The Johns Hopkins University Press, 2 vols., 2142 pp. 
Thomas, O. 1895. On small mammals from Nicaragua and Bogota. Annals and Magazine of Natural History (6)16:55–60.

Nephelomys
Mammals described in 1895
Taxa named by Oldfield Thomas